The 1908–09 Bradford City A.F.C. season was the sixth in the club's history.

The club finished 18th in Division One, and reached the 3rd round of the FA Cup.

Sources

References

Bradford City A.F.C. seasons
Bradford City